Kengo Takaichi (born 6 April 1993) is a Japanese judoka.

He is the gold medallist of the 2016 Judo Grand Prix Tashkent in the -60 kg category.

References

External links
 

1993 births
Living people
Japanese male judoka
20th-century Japanese people
21st-century Japanese people